The Subway 400 was the second race of the NASCAR Winston Cup Series season until 2004, held a week after the Daytona 500. This 400-mile (644 km) annual race was sponsored by Subway and was held at North Carolina Speedway (The Rock) since 1966.   From 1966 to 1995, the race distance was 500 miles (805-km) which was shortened to 400 miles starting from the 1996 season.

Until the 2004 Nextel Cup season, two annual races were held at Rockingham. After the 2003 season, the fall race (the Pop Secret Microwave Popcorn 400) — which was held in November — was moved to California Speedway, to be held on the lucrative Labor Day weekend. This displaced the Mountain Dew Southern 500 at Darlington Raceway, which moved to November 2004 before being removed from the schedule completely (replaced by a second date at Texas Motor Speedway). The changes were part of the trend of less races being held in the southeast and a broader distribution across the United States. Though the spring date was not directly transferred to California, NASCAR moved up the first California race to the traditional spring Rockingham date the week after Daytona. This resulted in some criticism because teams had to travel cross-country for the second race as most spend two weeks in Daytona and are based in the Charlotte, North Carolina area. The draw for Rockingham was that teams got to stay close to home right after Daytona before traveling for the next race.

The 2004 Subway 400 had one of the closest finishes in NASCAR history. Nextel Cup rookie, Kasey Kahne, in just his second series start, lost the race to Matt Kenseth by inches at the line. The exciting finish proved to be NASCAR's last stand at Rockingham, as the race (and the track, for that matter), were removed from the schedule permanently after that due to the Ferko lawsuit.

Past winners

1974: Race shortened due to energy crisis.
1983: Race started on March 6; finished a week later on March 13 due to rain.
2001: Race started on Sunday but was finished on Monday due to rain.

Multiple winners (drivers)

Multiple winners (manufacturers)

Notable Races
1972: Bobby Allison started last and led over 300 laps before breaking, and pole-sitter Bobby Isaac took the win, his final in Grand National racing.
1973: David Pearson led all but one lap en route to an overwhelming win, the beginning of his 1973 assault on superspeedway records.
1975: Cale Yarborough edged Pearson after Richard Petty lost several laps with a cracked cylinder head.
1976: Petty won by two laps as Bobby Allison survived a shocking tumble down the backstretch.
1977: Crashes galore kept the average speed to 97 MPH as Petty took his sixth Carolina 500 win.
1979: Just two weeks after their crash in the Daytona 500, Cale Yarborough and Donnie Allison crashed while battling for the lead just 10 laps into the race, collecting several other cars; Darrell Waltrip and Richard Petty, both involved in the wreck, were pointedly critical of Yarborough's role. Bobby Allison took the win.
1981: Darrell Waltrip outlasted Petty and Cale for his first big track win with Junior Johnson.
1983: Petty edged Bill Elliott for his first win in seventeen months.
1985: Elliott suffered a leg injury in a hard crash, as Neil Bonnett edged Harry Gant in a photo finish, the second straight Rockingham race to end in a photo finish, and second straight heartbreaker for Gant.
1989: Rusty Wallace made up a lap as Dale Earnhardt and Ricky Rudd tangled on the backstretch.  Wallace pulled away to the win.
1990: Kyle Petty overwhelmed the field for his first win since 1987 and the first for SABCO Racing.
1995: Jeff Gordon edged Bobby Labonte for his first win of the season.
1996: A spirited battle for the lead ended in a wreck as Dale Earnhardt hit Bobby Hamilton into the wall off Four on Lap 343.
2001: One week after Dale Earnhardt's death, Steve Park drove a Dale Earnhardt, Inc. Chevrolet to a close win over Bobby Labonte. It was his final win in the Cup Series.
2002: Matt Kenseth ended a two-year victory drought after escaping a multicar melee on the backstretch when Jeff Gordon spun out Casey Atwood and four-other cars piled in.
2003: Dale Jarrett scored his second to last win.
2004: The final race at Rockingham ended in a close finish won by Matt Kenseth over rookie Kasey Kahne.

See also
 NASCAR Realignment

References

External links
 

Former NASCAR races